The 2007 season was the 3rd season of competitive football by Universidad San Martín de Porres.

Statistics

Appearances and goals
Last updated on January, 2006.

Competition Overload

Copa Sudamericana 2006

Preliminary Chile/Peru

Primera División Peruana 2006

Apertura 2006

Clausura 2006

Pre-season friendlies

Transfers

In

Out

References

External links 
 Everything about Deportivo Universidad San Martín
 Deportivo Universidad San Martín de Porres - Copa Sudamericana 2006
 Deportivo Universidad San Martín de Porres - season 2006

2006
2006 in Peruvian football